Pattison is a surname that comes from North East England and Scotland, and may refer to

Adam Pattison (born 1986), Australian rules footballer
Andrew Pattison (born 1949), retired South African tennis player
Andrew Seth Pringle-Pattison (1856–1931), Scottish philosopher
Craig Pattison (born 1971), Canadian musician
Davey Pattison, Scottish singer based in the USA
Dorothy Pattison (1832–1878), British nurse, better known as Sister Dora
Edward W. Pattison (1932–1990), US Representative from New York
Eliot Pattison (born 1951), American lawyer
George Pattison (born 1950), British theologian
Ian Pattison, Scottish writer
Ian Pattison (cricketer) (born 1982), English cricketer
Jack Pattison (1887–1970), English footballer
James Pattison (Irish politician) (1886–1963), Irish politician
James Pattison (London MP) (1786–1849), Member of Parliament (MP) for the City of London 1835–41, 1843–49
Jim Pattison (born 1928), Canadian businessman
Jimmy Pattison (baseball) (1908–1991), American baseball player
John Pattison (RNZAF officer) (1917–2009), New Zealand WWII pilot
John George Pattison (1875–1917), Canadian soldier and Victoria Cross recipient
John M. Pattison (1847–1906), American politician
Mark Pattison (academic) (1813–1884), British academic and author
Mark Pattison (American football) (born 1961), NFL wide receiver
Matty Pattison (born 1986), South African footballer
Richard Dunn Pattison (1874–1916), British soldier and military historian
Robert E. Pattison (1850–1904), American politician
Robert Pattinson (born 1986), English actor
Séamus Pattison (born 1936), Irish politician, son of James Pattison
William Pattison, several people

See also
Patterson (surname)
Paterson (disambiguation)
Pattinson

References

English-language surnames
Patronymic surnames
Surnames from given names